Council Airport  is a state-owned public-use airport located one nautical mile (1.8 km) north of the central business district of Council, in the Nome Census Area in the U.S. state of Alaska.

Facilities 
It has one runway designated 10/28 with a gravel and dirt surface measuring 3,000 by 60 feet (914 x 18 m).

References

External links 
 FAA Alaska airport diagram (GIF)

Airports in the Nome Census Area, Alaska